Until the military coup of March 22, 2012 and a second military coup in December 2012 the politics of Mali took place in a framework of a semi-presidential representative democratic republic, whereby the President of Mali is head of state with a Presidentially appointed Prime Minister as the head of government, and of a multi-party system.

Executive power is exercised by the government. Legislative power is vested in both the government and the National Assembly. 
The Judiciary is independent of the executive and the legislature.

In August 2018, President Ibrahim Boubacar Keita was re-elected for a new five-year term after winning the second round of the election against Soumaïla Cissé.

On 18 August 2020 a coup d'état ousted the president and prime minister. On 25 September 2020, retired colonel and former defence minister Bah Ndaw was sworn in as Mali’s interim president.

On 15 April 2021, the transitional administration announced that legislative and presidential elections will be held on 27 February 2022. On 7 June 2021, Mali’s military commander Assimi Goita was sworn into office as the new interim president. On 30 December 2021, the transitional administration announced plans to delay the election by six months to five years in part because of security issues, leading to political opposition and sanctions.

Executive branch

|Interim President
|Assimi Goïta
|Military
|25 May 2021
|-
|Prime Minister
|Choguel Kokalla Maïga
|Independent
|6 June 2021
|}

Under Mali's 1992 constitution, the president is chief of state and commander in chief of the armed forces. The president is elected to 5-year terms by direct popular vote. He is limited to two terms. The president appoints the prime minister as head of government. The president chairs the Council of Ministers (the prime minister and currently 27 other ministers), which adopts a proposals for laws submitted to the National Assembly for approval of them.

Legislative branch
The National Assembly (Assemblée Nationale) has 160 members, elected for a five-year term, 147 members elected in single-seat constituencies and 13 members elected by Malians abroad. The National Assembly is the sole legislative arm of the government. Representation is apportioned according to the population of administrative districts. Election is direct and by party list. The term of office is 5 years.

The Assembly meets for two regular sessions each year. It debates and votes on legislation proposed either by one of its members or by the government and has the right to question government ministers about government actions and policies. Eight political parties, aggregated into four parliamentary groups, are represented in the Assembly. ADEMA currently holds the majority; minority parties are represented in all committees and in the Assembly directorate.

Political parties and elections

Mali's constitution provides for a multi-party democracy, with the only restriction being a prohibition against parties based on ethnic, religious, regional, or gender lines. In addition to those political parties represented in the National Assembly, others are active in municipal councils.

Presidential elections

Parliamentary elections

Judicial branch
Mali's legal system is based on codes inherited at independence from France. New laws have been enacted to make the system conform to Malian life, but French colonial laws not abrogated still have the force of law. The constitution provides for the independence of the judiciary.

The Ministry of Justice appoints judges and supervises both law enforcement and judicial functions. The Supreme Court has both judicial and administrative powers. Under the constitution, there is a separate constitutional court and a high court of justice with the power to try senior government officials in cases of treason.

Administrative divisions

Administratively, Mali is divided into ten regions (Gao, Ménaka, Kayes, Kidal,  Koulikoro, Mopti, Ségou, Sikasso, Tombouctou, Taoudénit) and the capital district of Bamako, each under the authority of an elected governor. Each region consists of five to nine districts (or Cercles), administered by Prefects. Cercles are divided into communes, which, in turn, are divided into villages or quarters.

A decentralisation and democratisation process began in the 1990s with the establishment of 702 elected municipal councils, headed by elected mayors, and previously appointed officials have been replaced with elected officials, which culminates in a National council of local officials. Other changes included greater local control over finances, and the reduction of administrative control by the central government.

Foreign relations

Mali is member of 
ACCT, 
ACP, 
AfDB, 
CCC, 
ECA, 
ECOWAS, 
FAO, 
FZ, 
G-77, 
IAEA, 
IBRD, 
ICAO, 
ICCt, 
ICFTU, 
ICRM, 
IDA, 
IDB, 
IFAD, 
IFC, 
IFRCS, 
ILO, 
IMF, 
Intelsat, 
Interpol, 
IOC, 
IOM, 
ITU, 
MIPONUH, 
MONUC, 
NAM, 
OAU, 
OIC, 
OPCW, 
UN, 
UNCTAD, 
UNESCO, 
UNIDO, 
UPU, 
WADB (regional), 
WAEMU, 
WCL, 
WFTU, 
WHO, 
WIPO, 
WMO, 
WToO, 
WTrO

References

External links
  Official portal of the Government of Mali
  Official portal of the President of Mali
  Government Decree 4-141, May 2004 - Official list of the Ministers and Ministries of the Government of Mali, at the official portal of the President of Mali

 
Government of Mali